Devaria may refer to:

 Devaria, Kachchh, a village in Kutch, Gujarat, India
 Devaria, Saurashtra, a village in Saurashtra, Gujarat, India
 Deoria district, a district of Uttar Pradesh, India also called Devaria
 Deoria, Uttar Pradesh, a town in Uttar Pradesh, India also called Devaria

See also
 Deoria (disambiguation)